Calytrix oldfieldii is a species of plant in the myrtle family Myrtaceae that is endemic to Western Australia.

It usually blooms between April and November producing purple-pink-violet to red star-shaped flowers.

Found on sand plains in an area along the west coast of the Mid West region of Western Australia where it grows on sandy soils over laterite.

References

Plants described in 1867
oldfieldii
Flora of Western Australia